Ağaçlıboyno is a village in the Şehitkamil District, Gaziantep Province, Turkey. The village had a population of 275 in 2021. The village is inhabited by Turkmens.

References

Villages in Şehitkamil District